Hornbeck Offshore Services, sometimes shortened to Hornbeck Offshore, through its subsidiaries, operates offshore supply vessels (OSVs), multi-purpose support vessels (MPSVs), and a shore-base facility to provide logistics support and specialty services to the offshore oil and gas exploration and production industry, primarily in the United States, Gulf of Mexico, and select international markets. The company is a provider of marine services to exploration and production, oilfield service, offshore construction and military customers. Its upstream segment owns and operates fleets of United States flagged, new generation OSVs and United States-owned fleets of DP-2 and DP-3 MPSVs.

The company recently sold its fleet of ocean-going tugs and product barges to Genesis Energy. The company will continue to focus on its core business of operating a modern fleet of OSVs primarily in the US Gulf of Mexico.

HOS recently announced newbuild program #5, which consists of a total of sixteen high-technology, new-generation OSV's. HOS has the option for additional such vessels should future market conditions warrant. The shipyards VT Halter Marine, Inc of Pascagoula, 
Mississippi and Eastern Shipbuilding of Panama City, Florida have been separately contracted to build the vessels.

In December 2019, Hornbeck was featured on an episode of The Indicator from Planet Money, where the hosts buy some high-yield bonds issued by Hornbeck, nicknaming the bond "Becky with the Good Yield".

On 20 December 2019, Hornbeck was de-listed from the NYSE.

On May 19, 2020, Hornbeck Offshore Services filed for Chapter 11 bankruptcy. They have more than $1.2 billion in debt on the books, with the largest unsecured creditor being Wilmington Trust National Association, which is owed $675 million plus interest.

See also 
 Hornbeck Offshore Services LLC v. Salazar

References

External links 
 hornbeckoffshore.com

Companies formerly listed on the New York Stock Exchange
Drilling rig operators
Oilfield services companies
St. Tammany Parish, Louisiana
Companies based in New Orleans
Shipping companies of the United States
1997 establishments in Louisiana
American companies established in 1997
Companies that filed for Chapter 11 bankruptcy in 2020
Service companies of the United States